This is a list of flash flood emergencies issued by the National Weather Service in the United States and United States territories. According to the National Weather Service, flash flood emergencies are only issued in “exceedingly rare situations”, when extremely heavy rainfall can cause “catastrophic damage” and a severe threat to human life.

Chronology of events

2022
In 2022, 31 flash flood emergencies were issued by the National Weather Service, with eight in Kentucky, six in Florida, four in Wyoming, three in Georgia, two each in Arizona, Mississippi, Missouri, and Oklahoma, and one each in California and Puerto Rico.

2023
In 2023, eight flash flood emergencies have been issued by the National Weather Service; all in California.

See also

Floods in the United States (2000–present)
List of United States tornado emergencies

References

National Weather Service
Weather warnings and advisories
Floods in the United States